The 2017–18 Premier Limited Overs Tournament was a List A cricket competition that took place in Sri Lanka. It was the seventeenth edition of the Premier Limited Overs Tournament, and the first since the 2015–16 edition, after the 2016–17 tournament was cancelled following a legal challenge and replaced by the 2016–17 Districts One Day Tournament. The tournament started on 9 March 2018 and finished on 25 March 2018. Rain affected the first few days of fixtures, with several games ending as a no result.

Following the conclusion of the group stage, Burgher Recreation Club, Chilaw Marians Cricket Club, Colts Cricket Club, Nondescripts Cricket Club, Ragama Cricket Club, Saracens Sports Club, Sinhalese Sports Club and Tamil Union Cricket and Athletic Club progressed to the quarterfinals. Chilaw Marians Cricket Club, Nondescripts Cricket Club, Saracens Sports Club and Sinhalese Sports Club won their quarterfinals to progress to the semi-finals. In the semi-finals, Nondescripts beat Saracens by 89 runs and Sinhalese beat Chilaw Marians by 8 wickets to advance to the tournament final. In the final, Sinhalese Sports Club beat Nondescripts Cricket Club by 4 wickets to win the tournament.

In February 2019, Sri Lanka Cricket named Lahiru Milantha as the tournament's Best Batsman, Sachithra Senanayke as the Best Bowler and Shehan Jayasuriya as the Player of the Tournament.

Fixtures

Group stage

Group A

Group B

Group C

Group D

Knockout stage

Quarterfinals

Finals

References

External links
 Series home at ESPN Cricinfo

Districts One Day Tournament
Premier Limited Overs Tournament